The 2012 Torneo Clausura was part of the 62nd completed season of the Primera B de Chile.

San Marcos de Arica was tournament's champion.

League table

References

External links
 RSSSF 2012

Primera B de Chile seasons
Primera B
Chil